Drew Hester (born August 26, 1969) is a drummer, percussionist, and record producer, winning two Grammy Awards with Foo Fighters. He has played drums with Joe Walsh (1999—2016) on drums, Stevie Nicks (2017–present) on drums, Beck (2014) on drums/percussion, Jewel (2006—2007) on drums, Foo Fighters (2005—2014) on percussion, Chicago (2009—2012) on drums and percussion, Lisa Marie Presley (2002—2006) on drums, Common Sense (1992—2005) on drums, Taylor Hawkins and the Coattail Riders on drums and percussion, and with many others.

In 2006, Hester toured with The Foo Fighters on their AFOOSTIC tour and played percussion on their live album and DVD Skin and Bones. Hester also produced the 2006 self-titled album of Taylor Hawkins and the Coattail Riders, and was also given credit for mixing the album. Hester also performs on the songs "It's Ok Now", "End Of The Line", "You Drive Me Insane" (percussion), "Better You Than Me" (handclaps and percussion), "Walking Away" (piano) and "Running In Place" (drums).

In 2008, Hester was given credit for mixing and as an engineer on the Foo Fighters single "The Pretender", the first off of their album Echoes, Silence, Patience & Grace. He is also credited for playing percussion on the songs "Come Alive", "Let it Die", "Cheer Up, Boys (Your Make Up Is Running)", "Long Road to Ruin" and "Summer's End". In 2008, the Foo Fighters won two Grammys for Best Rock Album and for Best Hard Rock Performance.

In addition, Hester plays drums at Saddleback Church in Orange County, California.

In January 2009, Hester joined Chicago on drums while Tris Imboden was undergoing medical treatment. Hester played drums on the 2009 Chicago & Earth, Wind and Fire tour. After Tris returned to active duty, Hester remained part of the band on percussion. In 2012, he departed to rejoin Joe Walsh and ex-Santana player Walfredo Reyes Jr. assumed that role.

Hester endorses Evans Drum Heads.

Discography

References

Living people
1969 births
Chicago (band) members
20th-century American drummers
American male drummers
20th-century American male musicians